The Utah State Training School Amphitheater and Wall, is an amphitheater and boundary wall in northwest American Fork, Utah, United States, that is listed on the National Register of Historic Places.

Description
The structures are located roughly at 845 east 700 north and are part of the Utah State Developmental Center (formerly known as the Utah State Training School). They were built of stone by the Works Progress Administration in 1936.

The amphitheater and wall were jointly added to the National Register of Historic Places October 7, 1994.  Completed in 1996, the Mount Timpanogos Temple was built directly east of the amphitheater, just across north 900 rast.

See also

 National Register of Historic Places listings in Utah County, Utah
 Recreation Center for the Utah State Hospital in Provo, also WPS-built and also NRHP-listed

References

External links

Theatres completed in 1936
Buildings and structures in American Fork, Utah
Works Progress Administration in Utah
National Register of Historic Places in Utah County, Utah
Event venues on the National Register of Historic Places in Utah
1936 establishments in Utah
Amphitheaters on the National Register of Historic Places